Acronicta theodora is a moth of the family Noctuidae. It is found in North America, including Mexico.

References

theodora
Moths of North America
Moths described in 1894